The 1971 Men's World Team Amateur Squash Championships were held in Palmerston North, Henderson and Auckland, New Zealand, and took place from 6 to 16 August 1971.

Results

See also 
World Team Squash Championships
World Squash Federation
World Open (squash)

References 

World Squash Championships
Squash tournaments in New Zealand
International sports competitions hosted by New Zealand
Squash
Mens
August 1971 sports events in New Zealand